Lost Queens, or Locas Perdidas, is a short film of Chilean director Ignacio Juricic. The film was released at the 2015 Cannes Film Festival, where it was one of just 18 short films shortlisted from a list of 1,600 for the Cinéfondation and won second prize.

Plot 
In 1996, 18-year-old Rodrigo is arrested by the police in a televised raid on the club where he works as a drag queen. He returns home fearful that his family will see him on the news. While all the family is getting ready for a wedding, he makes plans to run away with the 48-year-old hairdresser Mauricio, a family friend and Rodrigo's boyfriend.

See also 
 Cinema of Chile

References

External links 
 Cannes Film Festival official review
 Official website
 

LGBT-related short films
2015 films
Chilean LGBT-related films
Chilean short films
2015 LGBT-related films
Drag (clothing)-related films